No Me Acuerdo Quien Fuí  (English: "I Don't Remember Who I Was") is the debut studio album by Peruvian singer-songwriter Christian Meier released in 1996 by his own record company Roma Records. The album's lead single Carreteras Mojadas was released in February 1996 and became a huge hit in Perú to the point that 25 years later, it's still as relevant as it was when it was released.

Commercial performance
The album had great success in Perú being certified double platinum. The singles from the album all had airplay success in Perú reaching the top spot on several radio stations. The most successful single from the album was "Carreteras Mojadas",  which topped the airplay charts for 5 weeks in Perú and became the most played song of 1996 in the country. The song was written by Peruvian singer-songwriter Gian Marco. In 2021 Meier uploaded the music videos of the album's singles to his official YouTube channel to celebrate the 25th anniversary of the album's release.

Critical reception

The album was well received in Perú having several hits on the radio, selling thousands of copies, and being certified gold & multi-platinum. It received a 2.75 star rating on Rate Your Music.

Track listing
All credits adapted from Discogs.

Certifications and sales

References

1996 albums
Spanish-language albums